War in Peace (German: Krieg im Frieden) is a 1925 German silent film directed by Carl Boese and starring Trude Berliner, Hans Sternberg, and Charles Willy Kayser.

The film's sets were designed by the art director Fritz Kraencke.

Cast

References

Bibliography
 Gerhard Lamprecht. Deutsche Stummfilme, Volume 8.

External links

1925 films
1925 romantic comedy films
German romantic comedy films
Films of the Weimar Republic
Films directed by Carl Boese
German silent feature films
German black-and-white films
Military humor in film
Films set in the 1900s
Silent romantic comedy films
1920s German films